The Wandering Rocks (Planctae) in Greek mythology were a group of moving rocks between which the sea was unusually violent.

Wandering Rocks may also refer to:

 "Wandering Rocks" (Ulysses episode) an episode in James Joyce's novel Ulysses
 Sailing stones, where rocks move and inscribe long tracks along a smooth valley floor without human or animal intervention
 Sculptures by American artist Tony Smith:
 Wandering Rocks (2/5), Lynden Sculpture Garden near Milwaukee, Wisconsin
 Wandering Rocks (4/5), Lynden Sculpture Garden near Milwaukee, Wisconsin
 Wandering Rocks (AP), Olympic Sculpture Park in Seattle, Washington
 Wandering Rocks, a 2014 François Sarhan composition